Eliana Pittman (born Eliana Leite Da Silva; August 14, 1945), is a Brazilian former singer and actress. Pittman was one of the more soulful singers of the early 1970s. The stepdaughter of the jazz saxophonist Booker Pittman, she was deeply influenced and encouraged by him to become an artist, as he was her first music teacher, mentor and partner on some records.

With a distinctive swinging voice and intensity in her style, Pittman was a brilliant scat singer who turned insipid novelty tunes and light pop into definitive, jazz based treatment. Her first great hit was Tristeza, recorded in 1966, which gained her instant recognition in South America, though she never had a huge hit like Astrud Gilberto's Garota de Ipanema. During the 60s and 70s, she toured throughout Brazil, Italy, France, Japan, US, Spain and Venezuela. In 2001, Pittman opened a new tour starting from Rio de Janeiro. Since then, she has been alternating moments of reclusion and some activity as a TV actress.

Selected discography
Eliana & Booker Pittman – News From Brazil (Odeon/Paradise Masters, Brazil, 1963)
Eliana Pittman  (Odeon/Amazon, Brazil, 1972)
Quem Vai Querer (RCA, Brazil, 1977)
Soul Of Brazil – Funk, Soul, & Bossa Grooves 1965 to 1977 (EMI/Odeon, France, late 1970s)

Selected filmography 
 1966 Run for Your Life as singer
 1971 The Sandpit Generals as Dalvah
 1986 Jubiabá
 2005 América as Rainha do Forró
 2010 Tempos Modernos as Miranda Paranhos
 2012 Preamar as Da Guia
 2013 Sangue Bom as Chica
 2019 Girls from Ipanema as Elza

Sources
Dusty Groove 

Loronix blog spot
 

1945 births
Living people
Bossa nova singers
Brazilian actresses
20th-century Brazilian women singers
20th-century Brazilian singers
Brazilian people of German descent
Brazilian people of American descent
Actresses from Rio de Janeiro (city)